Lieutenant General Zorawar Chand 'Zoru' Bakshi PVSM, MVC, VrC, VSM (21 October 1921 or 2 January 1921 – 24 May 2018) was a General Officer of the Indian Army, most widely known as one of the commanders of Indo-Pakistani War of 1965 (Operation Ablaze). He also has the distinction of being "India's most decorated General".

Family and early life
Bakshi was born to Bahadur Bakshi Lal Chand Lav, a decorated soldier in the British Indian Army who held the OBI. He was born in Bulyana in the Punjab Province of British India (now in Pakistan). As with many other non-Muslims of that region, his family had to shift to the newly-created Dominion of India after the Partition of India. Prior to the partition, he graduated from Rawalpindi's Gordon College in 1942 after which he joined the Indian Military Academy.

Military career

World War II
Bakshi was commissioned into the Baloch Regiment of the British Indian Army in 1943. Later he also did a course at Royal College of Defence Studies (RCDS), UK. His first major battle was against the Japanese in Burma in World War II, where he earned a Mention in Despatches for overcoming a heavily fortified Japanese position. After the liberation of Burma, he participated in the operations to liberate Malaysia from Japanese control, earning a fast-track promotion to the rank of a Major for his role.

Post-Independence
Upon the Partition of India in 1947, Bakshi was transferred to the 5th Gorkha Rifles regiment of the Indian Army. In the Indo Pakistani War of 1947-1948, he was awarded a Vir Chakra for his bravery in July 1948. Soon afterward he was awarded the MacGregor Medal in 1949. In 1951, he was selected to attend the Defence Services Staff College in Wellington.

In the Indo-Pakistani War of 1965, Bakshi was instrumental in the capture of the Haji Pir Pass from the Pakistani Forces, for which he was awarded the Maha Vir Chakra. The citation for the Maha Vir Chakra reads as follows:

In the early 1960s he led his battalion in a United Nations Operation to undo the secession of the province of Katanga from Congo, in the process earning a Vishisht Seva Medal. In 1969–1970, he led successful counter-insurgency operations in pockets of North East India, and was promoted to major-general on 23 November 1970. During the Indo-Pakistani War of 1971 he was instrumental in the capture of territory in what is now referred to as the crucial Chicken-Neck Sector, for which he was awarded the Param Vishisht Seva Medal. On 7 September 1974, he was appointed Military Secretary with the rank of lieutenant-general. On 15 December 1976, he was granted an extension of service past his statutory retirement age to 1 January 1979.

He is popularly known as "Zoru" in the Indian Army.

Military awards and aecorations

Dates of rank

See also
 Operation Gibraltar

References

Notes

External links
Article referring to Bakshi's role in the 1971 Indo-Pak war

1921 births
2018 deaths
British Indian Army officers
Recipients of the Maha Vir Chakra
Indian generals
Recipients of the Vir Chakra
Recipients of the Param Vishisht Seva Medal
Punjabi people
Punjabi Hindus
People from Rawalpindi District
Government Gordon College alumni
Military personnel of the Indo-Pakistani War of 1965
People of the Indo-Pakistani War of 1947
Recipients of the MacGregor Medal